Dmitry Orlov may refer to:

 Dmitry Orlov (banker) (1943–2014), Russian banker
 Dmitry Orlov (ice hockey) (born 1991), Russian professional ice hockey player
 Dmitry Orlov (writer) (born 1962), Russian-American engineer and a writer
 Dmitri Olegovich Orlov (born 1966), Russian mathematician
 Dmitry Moor, born Dmitry Stakhievich Orlov, Russian artist noted for his propaganda posters